Urvaste Parish was a rural municipality of Estonia, in Võru County. It had a population of 1,413 (as of 1 January 2009) and an area of 139.62 km2.

Settlements
Villages
Kassi - Kirikuküla - Koigu - Kõlbi - Kuldre - Lümatu - Pihleni - Ruhingu - Toku - Uhtjärve - Urvaste - Uue-Antsla - Vaabina - Visela

Gallery

References

External links
Official website
Urvaste blog 

Former municipalities of Estonia